Chenar Rudkhan (also Romanized as Chenār Rūdkhān; also known as Chenār, Chēnar, and Chinar) is a village in Chubar Rural District, Ahmadsargurab District, Shaft County, Gilan Province, Iran. At the 2006 census, its population was 481, in 117 families.

References 

Populated places in Shaft County